The 1992 United States presidential election in Indiana took place on November 3, 1992, and was part of the 1992 United States presidential election. Voters chose 12 representatives, or electors to the Electoral College, who voted for president and vice president.

Indiana was won by President George H. W. Bush (R-TX) and his running mate Vice President and former Indiana Senator Dan Quayle. The presidential contest in Indiana was not a surprise, with Bush winning 42.91% to 36.79% over Governor Bill Clinton (D). Still, the margin of victory was lesser than in earlier elections, whilst Clinton won in every state bordering Indiana. Billionaire businessman Ross Perot (I-TX) finished in third, with a significant 19.77% of the popular vote in Indiana. Indiana would continue to vote Republican in presidential elections until 2008, in which Barack Obama won by a close margin, becoming the first Democrat to carry the state since 1964.

, this is the last election in which Greene County, Harrison County, and Washington County voted for the Democratic presidential nominee.

Results

Results by county

See also
 United States presidential elections in Indiana

Notes

References

Indiana
1992
1992 Indiana elections